Proctor Valley is a valley in southwestern San Diego County, California, United States. It is traversed by Proctor Valley Road, a dirt road which connects the community of Jamul in the northeast to the Eastlake neighborhood of Chula Vista in the southwest.

The valley, which is home to numerous unique forms of plant and animal life, is being consumed by suburban development. It contains populations of the federally threatened plant Deinandra conjugens.

References

Geography of San Diego County, California